Bochen Lake is a lake located south of Morehouseville, New York. Fish species present in the lake are brook trout, and brown trout. There is a trail access on the west shore.

References

Lakes of New York (state)
Lakes of Hamilton County, New York